Loeber or Löber is a surname of German origin. Notable people with the surname include:

 Dietrich A. Loeber (1923–2004), German legal scholar
 Rolf Loeber (1942–2017), American psychologist and criminologist
 Walter Löber (1909–?), German racing cyclist

References

Surnames of German origin